X-Pulsion is a punk rock band from Brussels, Belgium, that formed in October 1977 and split in May 1978. Peter Schlager formed a new band of the same name but with a new line-up that played between fall 1978 and summer 1979.

Personnel

Original line-up
 Jean-Pierre Poirier alias Jerry Wanker alias Jerry WX: guitar
 Pedro Ramis alias Peter Schlager: lead vocals
 Klaus Klang: drums
 Kurt Klang: bass

Second line-up
 Pedro Ramis alias Peter Schlager: lead vocals
 Francis Lozet : guitar
 Jean-Pol Tinant : bass
 Bob Seytor : drums

Concerts 

October 14, 1977, Brussels - first concert in private house
December 31, 1977, New Year's Eve at the Brussels Martini Center
(date unknown) at the Grimmerin in Grimbergen

Single 
Heaven only knows/Schmucks/Castration (1978) - Romantik Records - mixed by Frédéric Jannin

See also 
 Punk rock in Belgium

References  
 Discogs.com retrieved on 2005-08-17
 Klang brothers: The Belgian Pop & Rock Archives  retrieved on 2005-08-19

Belgian punk rock groups